MBO Cinema Sdn. Bhd. (trading as MBO Cinemas), also known as MBO for short, is a chain of cinemas in Malaysia. It is the third largest cinema chain in the country after Golden Screen Cinemas and TGV Cinemas. MBO Cinemas went into liquidation in 2020 due to the COVID-19 pandemic. Later in 2021, Golden Screen Cinemas acquired MBO Cinemas' majority assets. But on 19 December 2021, it was relaunched with new investors and under a brand new management.

As of today, MBO Cinemas currently operates 9 outlets in Peninsular Malaysia located at Atria Shopping Gallery, Space U8, Taiping Sentral Mall, Teluk Intan, Elements Mall Melaka, Melaka Mall, Brem Mall, U-Mall Skudai and Quayside Mall.

Overview 

There were around 26 MBO Cinemas in Malaysia at the time of liquidation. The latest MBO Cinemas opened in AEON Mall Bandar Dato' Onn Johor Bahru. The cinema features 3 MBO Special Halls, namely BIG SCREEN, MX4D and KECIL. MBO Cinemas also offers standard halls at all its locations while some new locations offer MBO Special Halls.

MBO Cinemas Special halls
 BIG SCREEN
 ONYX
 KECIL
 PREMIER

KECIL was the first Children Family Movie hall by MBO Cinemas that features Family Bed, Beanie Seats and In-Hall Playground. KECIL was available at 7 MBO Cinemas locations in Malaysia.

Current locations

Northern Region

Central Region

Southern Region

See also 
 Lotus Five Star Cinemas
 Golden Screen Cinemas
 Tanjong Golden Village
 List of cinemas in Malaysia

References

2003 establishments in Malaysia
2021 disestablishments in Malaysia
2021 establishments in Malaysia
Cinema chains in Malaysia
Privately held companies of Malaysia